Robert Lee Patrick (October 27, 1917 – October 6, 1999) was a Major League Baseball outfielder. He appeared in nine games, going 4-for-15 at the plate. His career, like so many other players of the so-called Greatest Generation, was interrupted by World War II. He served in the U.S. Army attaining the rank of Staff Sergeant.

Sources

References

Major League Baseball outfielders
Detroit Tigers players
Alexandria Aces players
Beaumont Exporters players
Buffalo Bisons (minor league) players
Baseball players from Arkansas
Sportspeople from Fort Smith, Arkansas
1917 births
1999 deaths